Automotive News is a weekly newspaper written for the automotive industry, predominantly individuals corresponding with automobile manufacturers and automotive suppliers. Based in Detroit and owned by Crain Communications Inc, Automotive News is deemed to be the newspaper of record for the automotive industry. The brand has a team of more than 55 editors and reporters globally.

The company has its headquarters at 1155, Gratiot Avenue in downtown Detroit.

History 
George Slocum had felt for years that the auto industry needed a trade newspaper, and in 1925 he secured the financial backing to start one. Automotive News started as Automotive Daily News Slocum Publishing issued the first issue in New York on August 27, 1925, Slocum as its Detroit advertising manager. The chief backer of Automotive Daily News was Bernarr Macfadden.

In 1933, Slocum purchased the other investors' interest, moved the paper to Detroit and switched from publishing fives times a week to twice a week - Wednesday and Saturday. He discarded the midweek edition in June 1938, and with the June 4 issue changed the paper's name to Automotive News. Slocum also brought down the subscription price from $6 to $4 per annum. In 1939, he changed the publication day to Monday.

Circulation was 5,000 when Slocum moved the paper to Detroit. It grew to 12,000 at the commencement of World War II, but fell to 8,748 during the war. During 1942-45, when there was no auto industry, Automotive News retained 73 percent of its circulation. From 1936, Pete Wemhoff served as the Managing Editor, Editor, Publisher and General Manager for the next 35 years.

Slocum Publishing Co, ran the publication until 1971, when Crain Communications purchased it. Keith Crain became the Publisher and Editorial Director.

Today, Automotive News is a part of Crain Communications' Automotive News Group. Keith E. Crain is the Editor-in-Chief of Automotive News and Chairman of the Board of Crain Communications. Long tenured Publisher Jason Stein stepped down in 2021 and was replaced by KC Crain.

Extensions 
There are a number of different versions of the publication aimed at specific countries and regions. Automotive News Europe was started in 1996 focusing on the European auto industry. Automotive News China launched in 2006 and is published in both simplified Chinese and English. Automobilwoche is a print publication focusing on the German automotive industry. It is distributed twice monthly on Monday and has a circulation of appx. 15,000. Automotive IT was started in 1997 focusing on the auto IT industry and solutions. Automotive News Canada launched in 2015 and focuses on the Canadian automotive industry.

Annual events  
The brand hosts several annual events including:

Automotive News World Congress
Automotive News PACE Awards
Automotive News LA Marketing Seminar
Automotive News New York Marketing Seminar
Automotive News Best Dealerships To Work For
Automotive News Canada Best Dealerships To Work For
Automotive News F&I Week Online Conference
Automotive News Europe Congress
Automotive News Rising Stars
Automobilwoche Konferenz
Automotive News Retail Forum: Chicago
Automotive News Retail Forum: NADA
Automotive News Fixed Ops Journal Forum
Automotive News Leading Women Conference
Automotive News Canada Congress
Automotive News All Stars
Automotive News Canada Canadians To Watch
Automotive News Care My Cars

Online 
AutoNews.com provides automotive news updates. Throughout the day, visitors explore news generated using the combined resources of Automotive News, Automotive News Europe, Automotive News China, Autoweek, Bloomberg, and Reuters business news.

References

External links
 Automotive News homepage

Publications established in 1925
Newspaper companies of the United States
Newspapers published in Detroit
1925 establishments in Michigan
Automotive industry